Bruce J. Ayers (born April 17, 1962, in Boston, Massachusetts) is an American small business owner and politician who represents the 1st Norfolk District in the Massachusetts House of Representatives and is a former member of the Quincy, Massachusetts City Council (1992–2000).

Education & Career
Ayers graduated North Quincy High School, while taking college courses at Quincy College. After high school he entered Northeastern University and then the Harvard University Extension School. Ayers has also completed the Boston College Small Business Development Program.

Ayers is a small business owner, and retrofits vehicles for the physically challenged with adaptive driving equipment. He has owned Ayers Handicap Conversion Center for over 35 years.

Ayers served on the Quincy Democratic City Committee from 1990 to 2000. In 1992 he was elected to the Quincy City Council for Ward 6. Ayers served in both positions until being elected to the 1st Norfolk State Representative district in 1999.

Issues
Ayers has been an advocate for the physically disabled in the state legislature. In 2016, he filed legislation to end illegal use of handicapped parking spots.

In 2013 Ayers spoke to the need for additional laws to stop animal abuse following the highly publicized death of Puppy Doe". It involved a dog found dead and tortured in a park in Quincy, Massachusetts.

Ayers hosts a regular television show called Legislative Update with Rep. Bruce Ayers on Quincy public access TV. There he talks with local political leaders and speaks about the initiatives and bills he has supported.

Electoral history

See also
 2019–2020 Massachusetts legislature
 2021–2022 Massachusetts legislature

References

1962 births
Democratic Party members of the Massachusetts House of Representatives
Politicians from Quincy, Massachusetts
Northeastern University alumni
Harvard Extension School alumni
Living people
Quincy College (Massachusetts) alumni
21st-century American politicians